The year 1788 in science and technology involved some significant events.

Astronomy
 December 21 – Caroline Herschel discovers the periodic comet 35P/Herschel–Rigollet.

Biology
 Dr. Edward Jenner publishes his observation that it is the newly hatched common cuckoo which pushes its host's eggs and chicks out of the nest.
 James E. Smith founds the Linnean Society of London.
 Utamaro publishes Ehon Mushi Erami ("Picture Book of Crawling Creatures") in Japan with color illustrations.
 Thomas Walter publishes Flora Caroliniana, the first flora of North America to follow Linnaean taxonomy.
 Gilbert White publishes The Natural History and Antiquities of Selborne, in the County of Southampton (dated 1789), a pioneering observational study of English ecology.

Earth sciences
 James Hutton's Theory of the Earth; or an Investigation of the Laws observable in the Composition, Dissolution, and Restoration of Land upon the Globe is published for the first time, in Transactions of the Royal Society of Edinburgh.

Mechanics
 Lagrange's Mécanique analytique is published in Paris, introducing Lagrangian mechanics.

Medicine
 December 5 – Rev. Dr. Francis Willis is called in to advise on treatment of the mental condition of King George III of the United Kingdom.

Technology
 February 1 – Isaac Briggs and William Longstreet patent a steamboat in the United States.
 October 14 – William Symington demonstrates a paddle steamer on Dalswinton Loch in Scotland.

Awards
 Copley Medal: Charles Blagden

Births
 March 7 – Antoine César Becquerel, French scientist (died 1878)
 March 22 – Pierre Joseph Pelletier, French chemist (died 1842)
 April 18 – Charlotte Murchison, Scottish geologist (died 1869)
 May 10 – Augustin-Jean Fresnel, French physicist (died 1827)
 July 1 – Jean-Victor Poncelet, French mechanical and military engineer and mathematician (died 1867)
 July 23 – Prideaux John Selby, English ornithologist (died 1867)
 September 12 – Charlotte von Siebold, German gynecologist (died 1859)
 October 14 – Edward Sabine, Anglo Irish physicist, astronomer and explorer (died 1883)
 December 21 – Thomas Southwood Smith, English physician and sanitary reformer (died 1861)
 James Murray, Irish physician (died 1871)

Deaths
 April 16 – Georges-Louis Leclerc, Comte de Buffon, French naturalist (born 1707)
 May 8 – Giovanni Antonio Scopoli, Italian-Austrian naturalist (born 1723)
 October 17 – John Brown, Scottish-born physician (born 1735)
 December 6 - Nicole-Reine Lepaute, French astronomer (born 1723)
 Lucia Galeazzi Galvani, Italian scientist (born 1743)
 approx. date – Moses Harris, English entomologist and engraver (born 1730)

References

 
18th century in science
1780s in science